Charaxes tiridates, the common blue charaxes, is a butterfly in the family Nymphalidae. It is found in Senegal, Guinea, Burkina Faso, Sierra Leone, Liberia, Ivory Coast, Ghana, Togo, Benin, Nigeria, Equatorial Guinea, Cameroon, Gabon, the Republic of the Congo, the Democratic Republic of the Congo, the Central African Republic, Sudan, Ethiopia, Uganda, Rwanda, Burundi, Kenya, Tanzania, Angola and Zambia. The habitat consists of lowland evergreen forests and dense savanna.

The larvae feed on Phialodiscus unijugatus, Hugonia platysepala, Hugonia castaneifolia, Bombax reflexum, Chaetacme aristata, Celtis africana, Celtis durandi, Grewia tricocarpa, Grewia mollis, Afzelia africana, Flacourtia indica, Indigofera macrophylla, Osyris lanceolata, Blighia unijugata, Grewia forbesi, Bombax buonopozense, Albizia, Berlinia, Lonchocarpus, Hibiscus (including Hibiscus calyphyllus), Trema, Cassia, Dalbergia, Macrolobium, Millettia and Pterocarpus species.

Description

Male upperside forewings have a black ground colour glossed blue. There is a discal arc of five or so spots and a postdiscal sinuous line of eight to ten spots. These spots are light blue and slightly metallic. The margin has pale amorphous lunules. The hindwing has two postdiscal rows of the light blue spots, the second close to the margin which has pale more lineate lunules. There are two short tails.

The female upperside has light brown basal areas, more extensive on the hindwing. There is a discal band of white marks just inside the much darker distal part of the forewing and two apical white spots. On the hindwing the dark area is narrow has seven or so light blue and slightly metallic spots with some white scales. There are pale marginal lunules and one long and one short tail.

The underside wings are variously light brown with black pattern lines and in the female only a white discal band.

A full description is given by Walter Rothschild and Karl Jordan, 1900 Novitates Zoologicae Volume 7:287-524.  page 354 for terms see Volume 5:545-601

Taxonomy
Charaxes tiridates group.

The supposed clade members are:

Charaxes tiridates
Charaxes numenes - similar to next
Charaxes bipunctatus - similar to last
Charaxes violetta
Charaxes fuscus
Charaxes mixtus
Charaxes bubastis
Charaxes albimaculatus
Charaxes barnsi
Charaxes bohemani
Charaxes schoutedeni
Charaxes monteiri
Charaxes smaragdalis
Charaxes xiphares
Charaxes cithaeron
Charaxes nandina
Charaxes imperialis
Charaxes ameliae
Charaxes pythodoris
? Charaxes overlaeti
For a full list see Eric Vingerhoedt, 2013.

Subspecies
Charaxes tiridates tiridates (eastern Senegal, Guinea, Burkina Faso, Sierra Leone, Liberia, Ivory Coast, Ghana, Togo, Benin, western Nigeria)
Charaxes tiridates choveti Turlin, 1998  (Bioko)
Charaxes tiridates marginatus Rothschild & Jordan, 1903 (western and south-western Ethiopia)
Charaxes tiridates tiridatinus Röber, 1936 (Nigeria, Cameroon, Gabon, Congo, western and southern Democratic Republic of the Congo, Central African Republic, Sudan, Uganda, Rwanda, Burundi, western Kenya, north-western Tanzania, Angola, northern Zambia)

References

Victor Gurney Logan Van Someren, 1972 Revisional notes on African Charaxes (Lepidoptera: Nymphalidae). Part VIII. Bulletin of the British Museum (Natural History) (Entomology) 215-264.
Seitz, A. Die Gross-Schmetterlinge der Erde 13: Die Afrikanischen Tagfalter. Plate XIII 31

External links
Images of C. tiridates tiridates Royal Museum for Central Africa (Albertine Rift Project)
Images of C. tiridates tiridatinus (Albertine Rift Project)
Charaxes tiridates images at BOLD
Charaxes tiridates tiridates images at BOLD
Charaxes tiridates marginatus images at BOLD
Charaxes tiridates tiridatinus images at BOLD

Butterflies described in 1777
tiridates
Fauna of Rivers State